Headington Hill is a rural locality in the Toowoomba Region, Queensland, Australia. In the  Headington Hill had a population of 58 people.

History 
The locality was probably named after a large freehold estate belonging to the Davenport family. George Francis Davenport (1812–1849) emigrated from Oxfordshire in England to Australia in the 1840s with his brothers Robert and Stanley Davenport. His son George Henry Davenport (1831–1881) inherited the estate. 

The original Headington Hill is to the north-east of Oxford, England and George Francis Davenport would have known it well, as he was the brother of John Marriott Davenport, who lived in Davenport House  at the summit of Headington Hill above Oxford.

Headington Hill Provisional School opened on 11 May 1903. On 1 January 1909 it became Headington Hill State School. In 1910 it was renamed Nevilton State School. It closed in 1921.  Nevilton State School reopened circa 1936 and closed in 1958.

McGovern's Hill State School opened on 11 July 1912 but was renamed Headington Hill State School later that year. It closed in 1967. The school was located on the south-east corner of Gatton Clifton Road and McGovern Road.

In the  Headington Hill had a population of 58 people.

Road infrastructure
The Gatton–Clifton Road runs through from north to south-west.

References 

Toowoomba Region
Localities in Queensland